The 1996–97 Temple Owls men's basketball team represented Temple University as a member of the Atlantic 10 Conference during the 1996–97 NCAA Division I men's basketball season. The team was led by head coach John Chaney and played their home games, for the final season, at McGonigle Hall. The Owls received an at-large bid to the NCAA tournament as No. 9 seed in the Midwest region. Temple beat Ole Miss in the opening round before losing to No. 1 seed and eventual Final Four participant Minnesota, 76–57, in the round of 32. Temple finished with a record of 20–11 (10–6 A-10).

Roster

Schedule and results 

|-
!colspan=9 style=| Regular Season

|-
!colspan=9 style=| Atlantic 10 Tournament

|-
!colspan=9 style=| NCAA Tournament

Rankings

Awards and honors
Marc Jackson – Atlantic 10 Player of the Year

References 

Temple Owls men's basketball seasons
Temple
Temple
Temple
Temple